The List of artists in the Metropolitan Museum of Art Guide is a list of the artists indexed in the Metropolitan Museum of Art museum guide. The guide, with a foreword by the museum director Philippe de Montebello, was first produced in 1983 and the edition from 1994 has been digitized.

This guide was a new pocketbook version of the magazine-format guidebook published in 1972 as Guide to The Metropolitan Museum of Art, edited by Nora Beeson during Thomas Hoving's tenure. That guidebook was the first to include fold-out museum maps of the collection wings. This guide, with color illustrations followed by concise descriptions, was updated in 1983 and 1994 as The Metropolitan Museum of Art Guide (edited by Kathleen Howard during Philippe de Montebello tenure), and under the same name in 2012 (edited by Harriet Whelchel, Margaret Aspinwall and Elisa Urbanelli during Thomas P. Campbell tenure).

Background
Montebello claimed that the idea for the guide "to present a profile of the Met in terms of its strengths and weaknesses", came from the museum's senior editor Kathleen Howard in 1978 and took 5 years to make, based on a pocket-sized format inspired by the guidebook from the Germanisches Nationalmuseum of Nuremberg. Montebello drew up a list of 1,200 highlights and these were reconciled with the lists of the curators of the various collection to create 800 objects to be photographed and included. The museum's collections are spread throughout several wings in the Fifth Avenue location in addition to The Cloisters museum and gardens in northern Manhattan.  The entire collection houses over two million objects, tens of thousands of which are on view at any given time. The museum guide has been designed to highlight the various major sections based on the importance of their holdings in the "over-all hierarchy of the arts and public response". This explains why European paintings are represented by 87 pages, as opposed to 23 for Egyptian works of art.

In the following list from the index, the artist's name is followed by the location of one of their works and its page number in the guide. For artists with more than one work in the guide, or for works by artists not listed here, see the online guidebook, the Metropolitan Museum of Art website or the corresponding Wikimedia Commons category. Of artists listed, there are only 7 women, including Rosalba Carriera, Mary Cassatt, Louise Bourgeois, Adélaïde Labille-Guiard, Georgia O'Keeffe, Élisabeth Louise Vigée-LeBrun, and Susan Rothenberg.
For the complete list of artists and their artworks in the collection, see the website.
Robert Adam (1728–1792), European sculpture and decorative arts : page 272
Aert van Tricht (active 1492–1501), The Cloisters : page 411
Ahmad ibn al–Suhrawardi (1290–1320), Islamic art : page 336
Leon Battista Alberti (1404–1472), European paintings : page 178
Albrecht Altdorfer (1480–1538), Drawings and Prints : page 132
Amasis Painter (549-509 B.C.), Greek & Roman art : page 317
John Frederick Amelung (1741–1798), American Wing : page 38
American Chair Company, American Wing : page 40
Rafael and Gaspar Amezúa, European sculpture and decorative arts : page 301
Andokides Painter (ca. 530–515/10 B.C.), Greek and Roman art : page 318
Andrea del Sarto (1486–1530), European paintings : page 174
Fra Angelico (1387–1455), European paintings : page 177
Pier Jacopo Alari Bonacolsi (ca. 1460–1528), European sculpture and decorative arts : page 260
Antonio da Sangallo the Younger (1483–1546), European sculpture and decorative arts : page 261
Arkesilas Painter (active around 560 BCE), Greek and Roman art : page 316
Tiziano Aspetti (ca. 1559–1606), European sculpture and decorative arts : page 264
Milton Avery (1885–1965), 20th-century art : page 445
Hans Baldung (1484–1545), European paintings : page 190
Edouard Baldus (1813–1889), Photographs : page 423
Balthus (1908–2001), Robert Lehman collection : page 362
Baccio Bandinelli (1493–1560), European sculpture and decorative arts : page 262
Angelo Barovieri (died 1480), European sculpture and decorative arts : page 298
Joseph B. Barry and Son, American Wing : page 39
Antoine-Louis Barye (1796–1875), European sculpture and decorative arts : page 269
Georg Baselitz (b.1938), 20th-century art : page 453
Jules Bastien-Lepage (1848–1884), European paintings : page 241
Pompeo Batoni (1708–1787), European paintings : page 181
Max Beckmann (1884–1950), 20th-century art : page 443
Bartolomeo Bellano (1437–1496), European sculpture and decorative arts : page 259
Giovanni Bellini (1435–1516), European paintings : page 183
John Henry Belter (1804–1863), American Wing : page 40
Massimiliano Soldani Benzi (1656–1740), European sculpture and decorative arts : page 293
Berlin Painter (ca. 500–475 B.C.), Greek and Roman art : page 320
Berlinghiero Berlinghieri (1175–1236), European paintings : page 170
Émile Bernard (1868–1941), European paintings : page 253
Gian Lorenzo Bernini (1598–1680), European sculpture and decorative arts : page 264
Martin Guillaume Biennais (1764–1843), European sculpture and decorative arts : page 278
Albert Bierstadt (1830–1902), American Wing : page 22
George Caleb Bingham (1811–1879), American Wing : page 20
Etienne Bobillet (active in Bourges, 1453), Medieval art : page 389
Umberto Boccioni (1882–1916), 20th-century art : page 454
Arnold Böcklin (1827–1901), European paintings : page 219
Giambologna (ca. 1524–1608), European sculpture and decorative arts : page 262
Rosa Bonheur (1822–1899), European paintings : page 239
Pierre Bonnard (1867–1947), Robert Lehman collection : page 361
Gerard ter Borch (1617–1681), European paintings : page 211
Sandro Botticelli (1444–1510), European paintings : page 172
François Boucher (1703–1770), European paintings : page 230
Andre–Charles Boulle (1642–1732), European sculpture and decorative arts : page 273
Louise Bourgeois (1911-2010), 20th-century art : page 458
Nicolas Noël Boutet (1761-1833), Arms and Armour : page 67
Dieric Bouts (1415–1475), European paintings : page 200
Jean Brandely (active 1855–67), European sculpture and decorative arts : page 274
Edgar Brandt (1880-1960), 20th-century art : page 462
Georges Braque (1882–1963), 20th-century art : page 438
Bartholomeus Breenbergh (1598–1657), European paintings : page 208
Marcel Breuer (1902–1981), 20th-century art : page 465
Bronzino (1503–1572), European paintings : page 175
Pieter Bruegel the Elder (1526–1569), European paintings : page 204
Hendrick ter Brugghen (1588–1629), European paintings : page 208
Gaspero Bruschi (1710-1780), European sculpture and decorative arts : page 293
Buli Master, Oceania and Americas : page 79
Franz Anton Bustelli (1723–1763), European sculpture and decorative arts : page 297
Alexander Milne Calder (1846–1923), 20th-century art : page 456
Jean de Cambrai (died 1438), Medieval art : page 389
Robert Campin (1375–1444), The Cloisters : page 405
Canaletto (1697–1768), European paintings : page 188
Antonio Canova (1757–1822), European sculpture and decorative arts : page 265
Martin Carlin (ca. 1730–1785), European sculpture and decorative arts : page 276
Fra Carnevale (ca. 1425–1484), European paintings : page 178
Anthony Caro (1920–1939), 20th-century art : page 459
Vittore Carpaccio (1465–1527), European paintings : page 183
Jean-Baptiste Carpeaux (1827–1875), European sculpture and decorative arts : page 269
Annibale Carracci (1560–1609), Drawings and Prints : page 135
Mary Cassatt (1844–1926), Drawings and Prints : page 143
Paul Cézanne (1839–1906), European paintings : page 246
Charles-Michel-Ange Challe (1718–1778), Drawings and Prints : page 139
Chantilly porcelain, European sculpture and decorative arts : page 294
Chao Meng-fu, Asian art : page 113
Jean-Baptiste-Siméon Chardin (1699–1779), European paintings : page 197
William Merritt Chase (1849–1916), American Wing : page 29
Ch'ien Tsuen, Asian art : page 112
Petrus Christus (1415–1476), European paintings : page 199
Frederic Edwin Church (1826–1900), American Wing : page 22
Claude Lorrain (1604–1682), Drawings and Prints : page 134
Claus de Werve (ca. 1380–1439), Medieval art : page 390
Clodion (1738–1814), European sculpture and decorative arts : page 268
Chuck Close (b.1940), 20th-century art : page 451
Jean Clouet (1480–1541), European paintings : page 224
John Cobb (ca. 1715-1778), European sculpture and decorative arts : page 271
Thomas Cole (1801–1848), American Wing : page 21
Samuel Colt (1814–1862), Arms and Armour : page 68
John Constable (1776–1837), European paintings : page 223
Hans Coper (1920–1981), 20th-century art : page 463
John Singleton Copley (1738–1815), American Wing : page 18
Jean-Baptiste-Camille Corot (1796–1875), European paintings : page 236
Antonio da Correggio (1489–1534), European paintings : page 190
Gustave Courbet (1819–1877), European paintings : page 238
Jean Cousin the Elder (1490–1570), European sculpture and decorative arts : page 284
James Cox (inventor) (1723–1800), European sculpture and decorative arts : page 287
Lucas Cranach the Elder (1472–1553), European paintings : page 217
Bartolomeo Cristofori (1655–1731), Musical instruments : page 417
Carlo Crivelli (1430/35–1495), European paintings : page 182
Aelbert Cuyp (1620–1691), European paintings : page 212
Bernardo Daddi (ca. 1280–1348), Robert Lehman collection : page 348
Louis Daguerre (1787–1851), Photographs : page 423
Damiano da Bergamo (ca. 1480-1549), European sculpture and decorative arts : page 280
Honoré Daumier (1808–1879), European paintings : page 237
Gerard David (1460–1523), European paintings : page 202
Jacques-Louis David (1748–1825), European paintings : page 232
Stuart Davis (painter) (1894–1964), 20th-century art : page 444
John Henry Dearle (1860–1932), European sculpture and decorative arts : page 286
Joseph-Théodore Deck (1823-1891), European sculpture and decorative arts : page 292
Edgar Degas (1834–1917), European paintings : page 244
Willem de Kooning (1904–1997), 20th-century art : page 446
Eugène Delacroix (1798–1863), European paintings : page 236
Étienne Delaune (1518–1583), European sculpture and decorative arts : page 292
Charles Demuth (1883–1935), 20th-century art : page 441
Thomas Dennis (1638–1706), American Wing : page 34
André Derain (1880–1954), Robert Lehman collection : page 360
Richard Diebenkorn (1922–1993), 20th-century art : page 448
Charles-Guillaume Diehl (active 1811–ca. 1885), European sculpture and decorative arts : page 274
Otto Dix (1891–1969), 20th-century art : page 440
Gaspare Diziani (1689–1767), European sculpture and decorative arts : page 281
Domenichino (1581–1641), European paintings : page 193
Christian Dorflinger (1828-1915), American Wing : page 40
Jean-Claude Chambellan Duplessis (1699-1774), European sculpture and decorative arts : page 294
Albrecht Dürer (1471–1528), European paintings : page 217
Anthony van Dyck (1599–1641), European paintings : page 207
Thomas Eakins (1844–1916), Photographs : page 424
Ralph Earl (1751–1801), American Wing : page 18
Gerhard Emmoser (died 1584), European sculpture and decorative arts : page 288
Epiktetos (ca. 520–490 B.C.), Greek and Roman art : page 319
Euthymides (active 515-500 B.C.), Greek and Roman art : page 320
Euxitheos (6th century B.C.), Greek and Roman art : page 319
William Evans (landscape painter) (1798–1877), Photographs : page 426
Exekias (active 540–520 B.C.), Greek and Roman art : page 318
Jan van Eyck (1370–1441), European paintings : page 198
Henri Fantin-Latour (1836–1904), European paintings : page 242
John Flannagan (sculptor) (1895-1942), 20th-century art : page 454
Fletcher & Gardiner, American Wing : page 39
Giambattista Foggini (1652–1725), European sculpture and decorative arts : page 265
Jean Fouquet (ca. 1420–ca. 1480), Robert Lehman collection : page 354
Alexandre-Évariste Fragonard (1780–1850), European sculpture and decorative arts : page 295
Jean-Honoré Fragonard (1732–1806), European paintings : page 231
Francesco di Giorgio (1439–1502), European sculpture and decorative arts : page 280
Francesco Marmitta (ca. 1460–ca. 1504), Robert Lehman collection : page 352
Emmanuel Frémiet (1824–1910), European sculpture and decorative arts : page 274
Jean Frémin (1738-1786), European sculpture and decorative arts : page 287
Daniel Chester French (1850–1931), American Wing : page 32
Lucian Freud (1922–2011), 20th-century art : page 453
Joachim Fries (1579-1620), European sculpture and decorative arts : page 290
Antonello Gagini (1477-1535), European sculpture and decorative arts : page 260
Eugène Gaillard (1862-1933), 20th-century art : page 462
Thomas Gainsborough (1727–1788), European paintings : page 221
Paul Gauguin (1848–1903), European paintings : page 251
François-Thomas Germain (1726–1791), European sculpture and decorative arts : page 288
Domenico Ghirlandaio (1449–1494), European paintings : page 173
Michele Giambono (ca. 1400–ca. 1462), European paintings : page 182
Carlo Ginori (1702-1757), European sculpture and decorative arts : page 293
Giotto (1266–1337), European paintings : page 170
Giovanni di Paolo (1403–1482), European paintings : page 177
William Glasby (1863-1941), European sculpture and decorative arts : page 301
Hugo van der Goes (1440–1482), European paintings : page 201
Vincent van Gogh (1853–1890), European paintings : page 251
Hendrik Goltzius (1558–1617), Drawings and Prints : page 136
Julio González (sculptor) (1876-1942), 20th-century art : page 458
Gorham Manufacturing Co., American Wing : page 42
Arshile Gorky (1904–1948), 20th-century art : page 445
Francisco Goya (1746–1828), European paintings : page 197
El Greco (1541–1614), European paintings : page 194
Greenpoint Flint Glassworks, American Wing : page 40
Jean-Baptiste Greuze (1725–1805), European paintings : page 230
Grueby Faience Company, American Wing : page 42
Francesco Guardi (1712–1793), European paintings : page 188
Guercino (1591–1666), European paintings : page 193
Johann Wilhelm Haas (1698–1764), Musical instruments : page 415
Habib Allah, Islamic art : page 341
Jakob Halder (active 1576-1608), Arms and Armour : page 66
Frans Hals (1582–1666), European paintings : page 208
Han Kan, Asian art : page 110
William Harnett (1848–1892), American Wing : page 25
Marsden Hartley (1877–1943), 20th-century art : page 437
Rufus Hathaway (1770–1822), American Wing : page 18
Josiah Johnson Hawes (1808–1901), Photographs : page 423
Martin Johnson Heade (1819–1904), American Wing : page 23
Albert Herter (1871–1950), American Wing : page 41
Hishikawa Morunobu (1618-1694), Asian art : page 99
Meindert Hobbema (1638–1709), European paintings : page 216
Hochst, European sculpture and decorative arts : page 297
David Hockney (b.1937), 20th-century art : page 452
Franz Caspar Hofer, Musical instruments : page 415
Josef Hoffmann (1870–1956), 20th-century art : page 464
William Hogarth (1697–1764), European paintings : page 220
Hans Holbein the Younger (1497–1543), European paintings : page 218
Winslow Homer (1836–1910), American Wing : page 23
Pieter de Hooch (1629–1683), European paintings : page 214
Edward Hopper (1882–1967), 20th-century art : page 444
Jean Antoine Houdon (1741-1828), European sculpture and decorative arts : page 267
Emperor Huizong of Song (1082-1135), Asian art : page 111
Hung-jen (601-674 A.D.), Asian art : page 115
Imperial Porcelain Factory, European sculpture and decorative arts : page 297
Jean Auguste Dominique Ingres (1780–1867), European paintings : page 235
Ishiguro Msayoshi, Arms & Armour : page 71
François–Honoré–George Jacob–Desmalter (1770–1841), European sculpture and decorative arts : page 278
Georges Jacob (1739–1814), European sculpture and decorative arts : page 277
Jacometto Veneziano (active 1472–1497), Robert Lehman collection : page 352
Maurice Jacques, European sculpture and decorative arts : page 272
Wenzel Jamnitzer (ca. 1507–1585), European sculpture and decorative arts : page 289
Justus van Gent (1430–1490), European paintings : page 201
Jacob Jordaens (1593–1678), European paintings : page 206
Gilles Joubert (1689–1775), European sculpture and decorative arts : page 275
Juan de Flandes (1465–1519), European paintings : page 203
Wassily Kandinsky (1866–1944), 20th-century art : page 434
Johann Joachim Kändler (1706-1785), European sculpture and decorative arts : page 296
Kano Sansetsu (1589-1651), Asian art : page 96
Ellsworth Kelly (1923–2015), 20th-century art : page 449
Cornelius Kierstede (1674–1757), American Wing : page 34
Paul Klee (1879–1940), 20th-century art : page 461
Johann Köhler (1684-1755), European sculpture and decorative arts : page 278
Oskar Kokoschka (1886–1980), 20th-century art : page 461
Philip de Koninck (1619–1688), European paintings : page 212
Johann Joachim Kretzschmar (1677-1740), European sculpture and decorative arts : page 296
Jakob Kuntz, Arms & Armour : page 68
Kuo Hsi (c. 1020 - c. 1090), Asian art : page 111
Roger de La Fresnaye (1885–1925), 20th-century art : page 436
Adélaïde Labille-Guiard (1749–1803), European paintings : page 234
Dominick Labino (1910-1987), 20th-century art : page 463
Gaston Lachaise (1882–1935), 20th-century art : page 455
Charles-Honoré Lannuier (1779–1819), American Wing : page 38
Georges de La Tour (1593–1652), European paintings : page 224
Thomas Lawrence (1769–1830), European paintings : page 222
Pierre Le Bourgeois (died 1627), Arms and Armour : page 67
Charles Le Brun (1619–1690), European sculpture and decorative arts : page 284
Henri le Secq (1818-1882), Photographs : page 422
Fernand Léger (1881–1955), 20th-century art : page 450
Jean-Baptiste Lemoyne (1704–1778), European sculpture and decorative arts : page 266
Jean-Louis Lemoyne (1665–1755), European sculpture and decorative arts : page 267
Leonardo da Vinci (1452–1519), European paintings : page 215
Louis Alphonse Letellier (1780–1830), European sculpture and decorative arts : page 275
Emanuel Leutze (1816–1868), American Wing : page 24
Roy Lichtenstein (1923–1997), 20th-century art : page 450
Limbourg brothers (1385–1416), The Cloisters : page 405
Léonard Limosin (ca. 1505–ca. 1575), European sculpture and decorative arts : page 290
Filippo Lippi (1406–1469), European paintings : page 171
Kunz Lochner (1510–1567), Arms and Armour : page 64
Tullio Lombardo (ca. 1460–1532), European sculpture and decorative arts : page 260
Battista di Domenico Lorenzi (ca. 1527-1592), European sculpture and decorative arts : page 263
Lorenzo De Ferrari (1680–1744), European sculpture and decorative arts : page 282
Lorenzo Monaco (1370–1423), Robert Lehman collection : page 349
Lydos (ca. 565–535 B.C.), Greek and Roman art : page 317
Corneille de Lyon (1505–1575), European sculpture and decorative arts : page 290
Charles Rennie Mackintosh (1868–1928), 20th-century art : page 464
Frederick William MacMonnies (1863–1937), American Wing : page 33
Nicolaes Maes (1634–1693), European paintings : page 216
Aristide Maillol (1861–1944), European sculpture and decorative arts : page 270
Édouard Manet (1832–1883), European paintings : page 239
Andrea Mantegna (1430–1506), Drawings and Prints : page 130
Master Biduinus, The Cloisters : page 396
Jean Hey (1471–1500), Robert Lehman collection : page 354
Master of the Codex of Saint George (active first half of the 14th century–), The Cloisters : page 403
Master of the Life of Saint John the Baptist (1325–1350), Robert Lehman collection : page 349
Henri Matisse (1869–1954), Robert Lehman collection : page 360
Carpoforo Mazetti (1685-1743), European sculpture and decorative arts : page 281
Meissen porcelain, European sculpture and decorative arts : page 296
Johann Peter Melchior (1747-1825), European sculpture and decorative arts : page 297
Luis Egidio Meléndez (1716–1780), European paintings : page 197
Hans Memling (1430–1494), European paintings : page 201
Michelangelo (1475–1564), European sculpture and decorative arts : page 261
Michelino da Besozzo (ca. 1400–1450), European paintings : page 189
Nicola Michetti (1675-1759), European sculpture and decorative arts : page 281
Jean-François Millet (1814–1875), European paintings : page 238
Ferdinand Miseroni (1639-1684), European sculpture and decorative arts : page 300
László Moholy-Nagy (1895–1946), Photographs : page 426
Claude Monet (1840–1926), European paintings : page 248
Pierre Etienne Monnot (1657–1733), European sculpture and decorative arts : page 266
Juan Martínez Montañés (1568–1649), European sculpture and decorative arts : page 266
Henry Moore (painter) (1831–1895), 20th-century art : page 456
Gustave Moreau (1826–1898), European paintings : page 240
Moretto da Brescia (ca. 1498–1554), European paintings : page 191
James Morisset (1780-1852), Arms & Armour : page 67
Giovanni Battista Moroni (1525–1578), European paintings : page 191
Simone Mosca (1492–1553), European sculpture and decorative arts : page 261
Kolomon Moser (1868-1918), 20th-century art : page 464
Paul de Mosselman (active in Bourges, 1453), Medieval art : page 389
Bartolomé Esteban Murillo (1617–1682), European paintings : page 196
Naotane, Arms and Armour : page 71
Filippo Negroli (1525–1551), Arms and Armour : page 63
Jacques Neilson (1718-1788), European sculpture and decorative arts : page 272
New Bremen Glass manufactory, American Wing : page 38
Nikias (499-412 B.C.), Greek and Roman art : page 317
Ni Tsan (1301-1374), Asian art : page 113
Isamu Noguchi (1904–1988), 20th-century art : page 457
Emil Nolde (1867–1956), 20th-century art : page 443
Jean Baptiste Claude Odiot (1763-1850), European sculpture and decorative arts : page 289
Jean Francois Oeben (1721-1763), European sculpture and decorative arts : page 274
Korin Ogata (1658-1716), Asian art : page 96
Georgia O'Keeffe (1887–1986), 20th-century art : page 441
Giovanni Orello (1486-1572), European sculpture and decorative arts : page 277
Bernard van Orley (1490–1541), Robert Lehman collection : page 365
Master of the Osservanza Triptych (1430–1450), Robert Lehman collection : page 350
Erastus Dow Palmer (1817–1904), American Wing : page 31
Pieter de Pannemaker (fl. 1517–35), Robert Lehman collection : page 365
Willem de Pannemaker (1512–1581), European sculpture and decorative arts : page 282
Simon Pantin (1680-1728), European sculpture and decorative arts : page 291
Paolo di Giovanni Fei (ca. 1345–ca. 1411), European paintings : page 176
Claudius du Paquier (1679-1751), European sculpture and decorative arts : page 295
Jean-Baptiste Pater (1695–1736), European paintings : page 229
Joachim Patinir (1480–1524), European paintings : page 203
James Peale (1749–1831), American Wing : page 21
Peter Peck (1500/10–1596), Arms and Armour : page 64
Nicola Pellipario (1480-1538), European sculpture and decorative arts : page 292
Penthesilea Painter (active ca. 460–ca. 440 B.C.), Greek & Roman art : page 321
Perchtold, The Cloisters : page 408
Charles Percier (1764–1838), European sculpture and decorative arts : page 278
Pietro Perugino (1446–1523), European paintings : page 178
Francesco Pesellino (1422–1457), European paintings : page 172
Duncan Phyfe (1770–1854), American Wing : page 38
Giovanni Battista Piazzetta (1682–1754), Drawings & Prints : page 139
Pablo Picasso (1881–1973), 20th-century art : page 430
Piero della Francesca (ca. 1416/1417–1492), Robert Lehman collection : page 362
Piero di Cosimo (1462–1521), European paintings : page 173
Emile Pingat & Cie., Costume Institute : page 125
Giovanni Battista Piranesi (1720–1778), Drawings & Prints : page 139
Giovanni Pisano (1245–1314), Medieval art : page 384
Camille Pissarro (1830–1903), European paintings : page 241
Giambattista Pittoni (1687–1767), European paintings, 18th-century art
Antonio del Pollaiuolo (1433–1498), Robert Lehman collection : page 364
Jackson Pollock (1912–1956), 20th-century art : page 446
Baccio Pontelli (c. 1450-1492), European sculpture and decorative arts : page 280
Frans Post (1612–1680), European paintings : page 211
Nicolas Poussin (1594–1665), European paintings : page 226
Matthew Pratt (1734–1805), American Wing : page 19
Maurice Prendergast (1859–1924), Robert Lehman collection : page 369
Mattia Preti (1613–1699), European paintings : page 181
Jean Pucelle (ca. 1300–1355), The Cloisters : page 402
Paco Rabanne (b.1934), Costume Institute : page 127
Jean Dominique Rachette (1744-1809), European sculpture and decorative arts : page 297
Raphael (1483–1520), European paintings : page 222
Odilon Redon (1840–1916), Robert Lehman collection : page 369
Rembrandt (1606–1669), European paintings : page 216
Frederic Remington (1861–1909), American Wing : page 33
Guido Reni (1575–1642), European paintings : page 192
Pierre-Auguste Renoir (1841–1919), European paintings : page 248
Joshua Reynolds (1723–1792), European paintings : page 220
Jusepe de Ribera (1590–1656), European paintings : page 196
Il Riccio (ca. 1460–1532), European sculpture and decorative arts : page 261
Tilman Riemenschneider (ca. 1460–1531), The Cloisters : page 409
Léon Riesener (1767–1805), European sculpture and decorative arts : page 278
Bernard II van Risamburgh (1700-1760), European sculpture and decorative arts : page 274
Andrea della Robbia (1435–1525), European sculpture and decorative arts : page 258
Luca della Robbia (1399-1482), European sculpture and decorative arts : page 258
Auguste Rodin (1840–1917), European sculpture and decorative arts : page 270
David Roentgen (1743–1807), European sculpture and decorative arts : page 279
Rogier van der Weyden (1400–1464), European paintings : page 199
Salvator Rosa (1615–1673), European paintings : page 181
James Rosenquist (1933-2017), 20th-century art : page 450
Antonio Rosselino (1427-1479), European sculpture and decorative arts : page 258
Susan Rothenberg (1945-2020), 20th-century art : page 452
Henri Rousseau (1844–1910), 20th-century art : page 432
Théodore Rousseau (1812–1867), European paintings : page 237
Pierre Noël Rousset (1715-1795), European sculpture and decorative arts : page 275
Alexander Roux (1813–1886), American Wing : page 41
Gobelins Manufactory, European sculpture and decorative arts : page 272
Peter Paul Rubens (1577–1640), European paintings : page 204
Hans Ruckers the Elder (1545–1598), Musical instruments : page 416
Emile Jacques Ruhlmann (1879–1933), 20th-century art : page 465
Jacob Isaacksz van Ruisdael (1628–1682), European paintings : page 213
Andrea Sacchi (1599–1661), European paintings : page 180
Augustus Saint-Gaudens (1848–1907), American Wing : page 32
John Sanderson (died 1774), European sculpture and decorative arts : page 271
John Singer Sargent (1856–1925), American Wing : page 27
Stefano di Giovanni (1374–1451), European paintings : page 176
Charles Joseph Sax (1791–1865), Musical instruments : page 415
Martino Schedel, Drawings and Prints : page 139
Israel Scheuch, Arms and Armour : page 65
William Searle (1871-1944), American Wing : page 34
Georges Seurat (1859–1891), European paintings : page 252
Gino Severini (1883–1966), 20th-century art : page 460
Manufacture nationale de Sèvres (1740–present), European sculpture and decorative arts : page 294
Charles Sheeler (1883–1965), 20th-century art : page 440
Antoine Sigalon (1524–1590), European sculpture and decorative arts : page 292
Paul Signac (1863–1935), European paintings : page 252
Luca Signorelli (1441–1523), European paintings : page 178
Simone Martini (1284–1344), European paintings : page 176
David Smith (sculptor) (1906–1965), 20th-century art : page 458
William Smith of Warwick (1705–1747), European sculpture and decorative arts : page 271
Joseph Smith Pottery, American Wing : page 37
Albert Sands Southworth (1811–1894), Photographs : page 423
Chaïm Soutine (1893–1943), 20th-century art : page 442
Abondio Statio, European sculpture and decorative arts : page 281
Jan Steen (1626–1679), European paintings : page 213
Edward Steichen (1879–1973), Photographs : page 425
Clyfford Still (1904–1980), 20th-century art : page 447
Antonio Stradivari (1644–1737), Musical instruments : page 414
Paul Strand (1890–1976), Photographs : page 425
Gilbert Stuart (1755–1828), American Wing : page 20
George Stubbs (1724–1806), European paintings : page 221
Sultan-Muhammad (fl. ca. 1505–50) (16th century), Islamic art : page 339
T'ang Yin (1470-1523), Asian art : page 114
William Henry Fox Talbot (1800–1877), Photographs : page 422
Giovanni Battista Tiepolo (1696–1770), European paintings : page 186
Giovanni Domenico Tiepolo (1727–1804), European paintings : page 187
Louis Comfort Tiffany (1848–1933), American Wing : page 42
Tintoretto (1518–1594), European paintings : page 184
Titian (1485–1576), European paintings : page 184
Henri de Toulouse-Lautrec (1864–1901), European paintings : page 255
John Trumbull (1756–1843), American Wing : page 19
Cosimo Tura (ca. 1430–1495), European paintings : page 189
J. M. W. Turner (1775–1851), European paintings : page 223
John Henry Twachtman (1853–1902), American Wing : page 28
Cy Twombly (1928–2011), 20th-century art : page 448
Ugolino di Nerio (1295–1347), Robert Lehman collection : page 348
Umbo (1902–1980), Photographs : page 426
Giovanni Maria Vasaro, Robert Lehman collection : page 363
Diego Velázquez (1599–1660), European paintings : page 196
Johannes Vermeer (1632–1675), European paintings : page 214
Paolo Veronese (1528–1588), European paintings : page 185
Louise Élisabeth Vigée Le Brun (1755–1842), European paintings : page 234
Giacomo da Vignola (1507–1573), European sculpture and decorative arts : page 262
William Vile (c. 1700-1767), European sculpture and decorative arts : page 271
Jacques Villon (1875-1963), 20th-century art : page 434
Carl von Scheidt, European sculpture and decorative arts : page 298
William Guy Wall (1792-1864), American Wing : page 29
Wang Hui (Qing dynasty) (1632–1717), Asian art : page 116
John Quincy Adams Ward (1830–1910), American Wing : page 31
Thomas Warren (1727-1767), American Wing : page 40
Waste Basket Boutique, Costume Institute : page 127
Carleton Watkins (1829–1916), Photographs : page 424
Jean-Antoine Watteau (1684–1721), European paintings : page 221
Niclaus Weckmann (c. 1481-1526), Medieval art : page 391
James McNeill Whistler (1834–1903), American Wing : page 28
Joseph Willems (ca. 1715-1766), European sculpture and decorative arts : page 295
Garry Winogrand (1928-1984), Photographs : page 427
John Wootton (ca. 1682–1764), European sculpture and decorative arts : page 271
Charles Frederick Worth (1825–1895), Costume Institute : page 126
Frank Lloyd Wright (1867–1959), American Wing : page 43
Peter Young (pewter) (1749-1813), American Wing : page 37
Taddeo Zuccari (1529–1566), Robert Lehman collection : page 366

References

 Metropolitan Museum of Art website
 Metropolitan Museum of Art Guide, 1994 edition, on Google books
 :c:Category:Metropolitan Museum of Art
 Netherlands Institute for Art History

MET
 
New York City-related lists